Daniel Da Silva (born March 28, 1998) is a Canadian soccer player who plays as a forward.

Early life
During his youth career, Da Silva played for the Rush Canada Soccer Academy. In 2015, he went to Portugal joining the S.L. Benfica U18 team. He later returned to Canada, joining the Toronto FC Academy.

Career
While with Toronto FC Academy, he made his debut with Toronto FC III in League1 Ontario on April 30, 2017, scoring a goal in a 6–0 win over FC London. He finished the season with 11 goals for second most for the team behind Cyrus Rollocks, who scored 17 goals.

He made his professional debut for Toronto FC II in the second-tier USL on September 28, 2017 in a substitute appearance against Louisville City FC. He made his first professional start a week later, on October 7 against Bethlehem Steel F.C.

Career statistics

Club

References

1998 births
Living people
Canadian soccer players
Association football forwards
Soccer players from Toronto
Toronto FC players
Toronto FC II players
Canadian people of Portuguese descent